Abell S1063 is a cluster of galaxies located in the constellation Grus.

References

Galaxy clusters
Grus (constellation)